UFC 235: Jones vs. Smith was a mixed martial arts event produced by the Ultimate Fighting Championship held on March 2, 2019 at T-Mobile Arena in Paradise, Nevada, part of the Las Vegas Metropolitan Area.

Background
A UFC Light Heavyweight Championship bout between two-time champion Jon Jones and challenger Anthony Smith headlined the event.

A UFC Welterweight Championship bout between current champion Tyron Woodley and The Ultimate Fighter: American Top Team vs. Blackzilians welterweight winner Kamaru Usman served as the co-headliner.

As a result of the cancellation of UFC 233, a welterweight bout between former UFC Welterweight Champion Robbie Lawler and promotional newcomer and former Bellator Welterweight World Champion Ben Askren (also former ONE Welterweight Champion) was rescheduled for this event.

A women's bantamweight bout between former UFC Women's Bantamweight Champion Holly Holm and Aspen Ladd was expected to take place at the event. However, on January 31, it was reported the matchup was scrapped due to undisclosed reasons and both fighters are expected to face new opponents in other events.

Thomas Almeida was expected to face Marlon Vera at the event. Almeida pulled out of the fight on January 31 citing an injury. He was replaced by Frankie Saenz. However, the fight was cancelled entirely on February 27 when Vera pulled out of the fight due to illness.

Former interim title challenger Ovince Saint Preux was expected to face Misha Cirkunov at the event. However, on February 11, it was announced that Saint Preux suffered an injury and was pulled from the fight. He was replaced by Johnny Walker.

Song Yadong was expected to face The Ultimate Fighter: Latin America bantamweight winner Alejandro Pérez at the event, but pulled out of the bout on January 11 due to an undisclosed reason. He was replaced by Cody Stamann.

Results

Bonus awards
The following fighters received $50,000 bonuses:
Fight of the Night: Pedro Munhoz vs. Cody Garbrandt
Performance of the Night: Johnny Walker and Diego Sanchez

Reported payout
The following is the reported payout to the fighters as reported to the Nevada State Athletic Commission. It does not include sponsor money and also does not include the UFC's traditional "fight night" bonuses. The total disclosed payroll for the event was $3,334,000.

Jon Jones: $500,000 (no win bonus) def. Anthony Smith: $350,000
Kamaru Usman: $350,000 (no win bonus) def. Tyron Woodley: $500,000
Ben Askren: $350,000 (includes $150,000 win bonus) def. Robbie Lawler: $200,000
Zhang Weili: $36,000 (includes $18,000 win bonus) def. Tecia Torres: $36,000
Pedro Munhoz: $96,000 (includes $48,000 win bonus) def. Cody Garbrandt: $130,000
Zabit Magomedsharipov: $110,000 (includes $55,000 win bonus) def. Jeremy Stephens: $67,000
Johnny Walker: $90,000 (includes $45,000 win bonus) def. Misha Cirkunov: $45,000
Cody Stamann: $66,000 (includes $33,000 win bonus) def. Alejandro Pérez: $42,000
Diego Sanchez: $198,000 (includes $99,000 win bonus) def. Mickey Gall: $30,000
Edmen Shahbazyan: $26,000 (includes $13,000 win bonus) def. Charles Byrd: $12,000
Macy Chiasson: $50,000 (includes $25,000 win bonus) def. Gina Mazany: $14,000
Hannah Cifers: $24,000 (includes $12,000 win bonus) def. Polyana Viana: $12,000

See also 

 List of UFC events
 2019 in UFC
 List of current UFC fighters

References 

Ultimate Fighting Championship events
2019 in mixed martial arts
Mixed martial arts in Las Vegas
2019 in sports in Nevada
March 2019 sports events in the United States
Events in Paradise, Nevada